Stimulated Raman adiabatic passage (STIRAP) is a process that permits transfer of a population between two applicable quantum states via at least two coherent  electromagnetic (light) pulses. These light pulses drive the transitions of the three level Ʌ atom or multilevel system. The process is a form of state-to-state coherent control.

Population transfer in three level Ʌ atom
Suppose in the beginning the total population is in the ground state . Thereby a state is formed that permits the transformation of the population into state  without populating the excited state . This process of transforming the population without populating the excited state is called the stimulated Raman adiabatic passage.

Three level theory 
Allow the system to interact with two coherent radiation fields, the pump and Stokes fields. Setting the energy of state  to zero, the rotating wave Hamiltonian is given by 

 

The energy ordering of the states is not critical, and here it is taken so that  only for concreteness. Ʌ and V configurations can be realized by changing the signs of the detunings. Shifting the energy zero by  allows the Hamiltonian to be written in the more configuration independent form 

 

Here  and  denote the single and two-photon detunings respectively. STIRAP is achieved on two-photon resonance . Focusing to this case, the energies upon diagonalization of are given by 

 

where . Solving for the  eigenstate , it is seen to obey the condition 

 

The first condition reveals that the critical two-photon resonance condition yields a dark state which is a superposition of only the initial and target state. By defining the mixing angle  and utilizing the normalization condition , the second condition can be used to express this dark state as 

 

From this, the STIRAP counter-intuitive pulse sequence can be deduced. At  which corresponds the presence of only the Stokes field, the dark state exactly corresponds to the initial state . The latter  case corresponds to the opposing limit of a strong pump field. Practically, this corresponds to applying Stokes and pump field pulses to the system with a slight delay between while still maintaining significant temporal overlap between pulses; the delay provides the correct limiting behavior and the overlap ensures adiabatic evolution. A population initially prepared in state  will adiabatically follow the dark state and end up in state  without populating state  as desired. The pulse envelopes can take on fairly arbitrary shape so long as the time rate of change of the mixing angle is slow compared to the energy splitting with respect to the non-dark states. This adiabatic condition takes its simplest form at the single-photon resonance condition  where it can be expressed as

References

Quantum mechanics
Raman scattering
Raman spectroscopy